The UEFA Women's U-19 Championship 2010 Final Tournament was held in Macedonia between 24 May and 5 June 2010. Players born after 1 January 1991 were eligible to participate in this competition.

Qualifications

There were two separate rounds of qualifications held before the Final Tournament, beginning with the First qualifying round. The first 44 teams were drawn into 11 groups.

Top two teams from each group and the best third-placed team entered in a Second qualifying round along with Germany who automatically qualified. The 24 teams were drawn into 6 groups.

Then, the group winners and the runners-up team with the best record against the sides first and third in their pool join hosts Macedonia at the Final Tournament.

Final tournament

Group stage

Group A

Group B

Knockout stage

Semifinals

Final

Awards

Goal scorers 
4 goals
  Turid Knaak
  Lieke Martens

3 goals
  Rebecca Dempster

2 goals

  Lauren Bruton
  Toni Duggan
  Amélie Barbetta
  Léa Le Garrec
  Marina Makanza
  Annika Doppler
  Kyra Malinowski
  Francesca Vitale
  Merel van Dongen
  Kirsten Koopmans
  Vanity Lewerissa

1 goal

  Isobel Christiansen
  Laura Coombs
  Jessica Holbrook
  Solène Barbance
  Camille Catala
  Pauline Crammer
  Rose Lavaud
  Marie-Louise Bagehorn
  Hasret Kayikci
  Valeria Kleiner
  Carolin Simon
  Barbara Bonansea
  Michela Franco
  Marta Mason
  Natasa Andonova
  Mauri van de Wetering
  Jen Beattie
  Sarah Ewens
  Naiara Beristain
  Ana Buceta
  Carolina Ferez
  Maria Galan
  Maria Victoria Losada
  Irene del Rio

External links
Official website 
at UEFA.com
MacedonianFootball 

 
2010
Women
2010 in women's association football
2010
2009–10 in Republic of Macedonia football
2009–10 in French women's football
2009–10 in English women's football
2009–10 in German women's football
2009–10 in Dutch women's football
2009–10 in Spanish women's football
2009–10 in Italian women's football
2010 in Scottish women's football
May 2010 sports events in Europe
June 2010 sports events in Europe
2010 in youth association football
UEFA